Petr Tomašák (born 20 February 1986 in Ostrava) is a Czech footballer.

Tomašák played mostly for FC Baník Ostrava and won the Czech Cup with the team in 2005. Since 2012 he plays for Dolni Datyne 1.B class, now (2013) 1.A class.

External links
 
 

Czech footballers
Czech Republic youth international footballers
Czech Republic under-21 international footballers
FC Baník Ostrava players
FC Hradec Králové players
1. FK Příbram players
Sportspeople from Ostrava
1986 births
Living people

Association football midfielders